"GNF (OKOKOK)" is a song by American rapper Polo G, released on February 5, 2021, after being previewed on February 2. It was produced by Swedish producers WIZARDMCE and Varohl, who both wrote the song with Polo G.

Composition 
The song finds Polo G rapping about gang violence on a piano drill beat. He also shouts out to late American rapper Pop Smoke.

Critical reception
Wren Graves of Consequence of Sound called the song a "windows-down banger", with its energy derived from Polo G's "call-and-response flow". Tara C. Mahadevan of Complex called the beat of the song "lethal". Wongo Okon of Uproxx wrote that the song is "a strong display of the young rapper's nonchalant spirit as the record is backed by fearless lines like 'If 12 come up, we gon' take 'em on the chase / Just a cold heart and a banger on my waist'."

Music video
A music video was released on February 5, 2021 and was directed by Cole Bennett. The video shows Polo G rapping while surrounded by his crew; he is also seen "on snowy Chicago rooftops and in rainy streets".

Credits and personnel 
Credits adapted from Tidal.

 Polo Gvocals
 WIZARDMCEproduction
 Varohlproduction
 Taurus Bartlettsongwriting
 Dj Noverecording
 Eric Laggmastering
 Joe Grassomixing

Charts

Certifications

References

2021 singles
2021 songs
Polo G songs
Columbia Records singles
Gangsta rap songs
Music videos directed by Cole Bennett
Songs written by Polo G